The Commonwealth Gaza War Cemetery, often referred to as the British War Cemetery, is a cemetery administered by the Commonwealth War Graves Commission on the Salah al-Din Road in Gaza City's Tuffah district. The majority of burials at the cemetery are of Allied soldiers who lost their lives in World War I, principally in the First, Second and Third Battles of Gaza. Some 3,217 British and Commonwealth servicemen are buried in the cemetery; nearly 800 of the graves lack identification, and are inscribed "Soldier of the Great War, known unto God". 234 graves of non-Commonwealth soldiers are also present in the cemetery. A further 210 Commonwealth soldiers were interred in the cemetery following their death in World War II; the post-war period saw 30 more burials.

Another Commonwealth cemetery in Gaza is located in Deir al-Balah.

History
The cemetery had been completed by 1920, and has been tended by three men from the same family ever since. For 45 years the cemetery was tended by Ibrahim Jeradeh, who was employed by the Commonwealth War Graves Commission. Jeradeh's father was the cemetery's initial head gardener, and he himself was succeeded by his son. Jeradeh was awarded an MBE in "grateful recognition of outstanding contribution to the Commonwealth War Graves Commission". The MBE's accompanying certificate was signed by the Duke of Kent.

Amongst the graves is that of Stanley Boughey (1896–1917), who received the Victoria Cross for action against the Ottoman Army at El Burff, Palestine.

The cemetery has been struck by Israeli shells on two occasions in the 2010s. An Israeli airstrike in 2006 led to £90,000 in compensation being paid to the Commonwealth War Graves Commission; in addition some 350 headstones needed repair following damage from Israeli shells in Operation Cast Lead.

The British journalist and writer Mark Urban visited the cemetery in 2009 for BBC 2's Newsnight, and wrote an article for The Observer detailing his experiences there.

References

External links

 
 

1920 establishments in Mandatory Palestine
History of Gaza City
Buildings and structures in the Gaza Strip
Commonwealth War Graves Commission cemeteries in Palestine
Tourist attractions in the State of Palestine
World War I cemeteries
World War II sites in Mandatory Palestine
Burial monuments and structures in the State of Palestine